Zahira College (National School) Matale, (Arabic: Zahira means "Excellence";), is one of the oldest schools in the Matale District. It is situated in the centre of the city.

History

The school was founded on 3 August 1942 by Tuan Burhanuddin Jayah. The original  school site was donated by Vithanage Tergin Nanayakkara, the local member for Matale. The first buildings were funded by a donation from a local Muslim philanthropist, Cassim Had Sar. 

The school is noted for its accomplishments in the field of hockey, winning a number of national schoolboy championships. Hockey was first introduced to the school by a local businessman, George Mant, who learnt the sport at St. Thomas' College, Mount Lavinia. Mant with a number of other enthusiasts established the Matale Hockey Association in September 1942. The school has produced a number of national players, including S. I. Ajward, M. Ayub, M. Zarook, and A. J. M. Farook.

Houses

The houses compete to win the inter-house games held by the college annually.

Past Principals

Notable alumni 
 Abdul Cader Shahul Hameed (former Foreign Minister)

Further reading

References

Schools in Matale
Educational institutions established in 1942